Baby Jessica may refer to:

 Baby Jessica case, a 1993 custody battle and court case in Ann Arbor, Michigan
 Jessica McClure (born 1986), a toddler rescued after she fell down a well in Midland, Texas